WPXR-TV (channel 38) is a television station licensed to Roanoke, Virginia, United States, broadcasting the Ion Television network to the Roanoke–Lynchburg market. The station is owned and operated by the Ion Media subsidiary of the E. W. Scripps Company, and maintains a transmitter atop Poor Mountain in unincorporated southwestern Roanoke County.

History

The station signed on January 3, 1986 as WEFC, a religious station owned by Evangel Foursquare Church (hence the call letters). It was the first non-network affiliated station in Roanoke, and the first new UHF station in the market to sign on following the demise of WRLU channel 27 nearly 11 years earlier. Coincidentally, a new channel 27, under the calls of WVFT, would sign on two months after WEFC, carrying a similar format.

Paxson Communications bought the station in 1997 and made it part of the all-infomercial inTV network. It joined Pax TV (later i: Independent Television and now Ion Television) on the network's launch in 1998.

Newscasts
From September 1996 until August 1997, WDBJ produced a 10 p.m. newscast, News 7 Primetime, for WEFC; the newscast was canceled due to low ratings. From 2000 to 2005, WPXR aired rebroadcasts of WSLS-TV's newscasts as part of a joint sales agreement between Paxson Communications and WSLS owner Media General.

Technical information

Subchannels
The station's digital signal is multiplexed:

Analog-to-digital conversion
WPXR-TV discontinued regular programming on its analog signal, over UHF channel 38, on June 12, 2009, the official date in which full-power television stations in the United States transitioned from analog to digital broadcasts under federal mandate. The station's digital signal remained on its pre-transition UHF channel 36, using PSIP to display the station's virtual channel as its former UHF analog channel 38.

References

External links

Site of the Week – Roanoke, Virginia – discusses WPXR's antennas

Ion Television affiliates
Court TV affiliates
Laff (TV network) affiliates
Ion Mystery affiliates
Defy TV affiliates
TrueReal affiliates
Scripps News affiliates
E. W. Scripps Company television stations
Television channels and stations established in 1986
PXR-TV
1986 establishments in Virginia